Minim (or Minim II, or Menim) is a village in the commune of Martap, in the department of Vina, in the Adamawa Region, Cameroon. The village contains Cameroon's main source of bauxite.

Population 
In 1967, Minim contained 90 inhabitants, mostly from the Kaka ethnic group. In the 2005 census, the settlement contained 432 people.

Economy

Along with Ngaoundal, Minim is part of a large project to mine the bauxite of the Adamawa Plateau. Covering an area of 1000 km2, the deposit represents an important component of the Adamawa plateau and the gentle slopes which surround it make it easy to access.
Studies of feasibility and environmental impact were carried out and a mining development plan was completed in May 2016. Financing for the construction of a facility for refining the bauxite into aluminium and for transport infrastructure is still outstanding.

References

Bibliography 
  & François Desthieux, « Histoire géologique de Minim-Martap et du Ngaoundal », Annales de la Faculté des Sciences du Cameroun 5, pp. 27–32
 Jean Boutrais (ed.), Peuples et cultures de l'Adamaoua (Cameroun) : actes du colloque de Ngaoundéré, du 14 au 16 janvier 1992, ORSTOM, Paris ; Ngaoundéré-Anthropos, 1993, 316 p. 
 Dictionnaire des villages de l'Adamaoua, ONAREST, Yaoundé, octobre 1974, 133 p.

External links
 Histoire de l’activité minière et géologique au Cameroun, Cadre d'appui et de promotion de l'artisanat minier, June 2013
 Martap, on the Communes et villes unies du Cameroun (CVUC) website

Bauxite mining
Populated places in Cameroon